Bolama is the closest of the Bissagos Islands to the mainland of Guinea-Bissau. The island has a population of 6,024 (2009 census). It shares its name with ist largest settlement, the town Bolama, which is the capital of the island and the Bolama Region.

It is almost surrounded by mangrove swamps and is known for its cashew nuts.  Although often visited by local people, the island was apparently uninhabited when British colonists settled it in 1792. Following a series of failures, they abandoned the island in 1794, another colonisation attempt in 1814 also being quickly ended.

History
In 1792, Philip Beaver, an officer of the Royal Navy, led a failed attempt at resettling Black former slaves from the Americas on the island of Bulama off the coast of Portuguese Guinea. Most of the settlers died and the survivors abandoned the colony in November 1793 and made their way to Settler Town in what later became the Colony of Sierra Leone.

The Portuguese also claimed Bolama in 1830 and a dispute developed.  In 1860, the British proclaimed the island annexed to Sierra Leone, but in 1870 a commission chaired by Ulysses S. Grant awarded Bolama to Portugal. Subsequently, in 1879, the town of Bolama became the first capital of Portuguese Guinea and remained so until its transfer to Bissau in 1941. Bissau had been founded in 1687 by Portugal as a fortified port and trading center. This transfer was needed due to the shortage of fresh water in Bolama. Bolama later became a seaplane stop, and a seaplane crash in 1931 is commemorated by a statue in the town.

A fruit processing plant was built on Bolama shortly after independence of Guinea-Bissau, with Dutch foreign aid. This plant produced canned juice and jelly of cashew fruit. However, it could not expand and had to shut down its operations, due to the shortage of fresh water on the island.

Attractions on the island include sandy beaches and the abandoned ruins of the town of Bolama. It is also designated as a biosphere reserve, and the Bissau-Guinean government is aiming for it to be designated the nation's first World Heritage Site.  A causeway links the island to the Ilha das Cobras.

Further reading 
The history of the English colonisation attempt in 1792 is chronicled in the first six chapters of the 2013 book "The Ship of Death: The Voyage that Changed the Atlantic World" by (professor of history) Billy G. Smith.

References

External links 
Abolition Gone Wrong - article about the failed 1792 English settlement of Bolama

Bolama Region
Bissagos Islands
Sectors of Guinea-Bissau